Vimal Kumar Chordia (15 October 1924 – ) was an Indian politician who was a member of Rajya Sabha. He was a Member of Madhya Bharat Legislative Assembly from 1952 to 1957, and of the Madhya Pradesh Legislative Assembly from 1957 to 1962. Chordia served as vice-president of state unit of Bharatiya Jan Sangh and was member of Rajya Sabha from 1962 to 1968. Chordia's death was announced on 9 January 2019.

References

1924 births
2010s deaths
Year of death uncertain
Rajya Sabha members from Madhya Pradesh
Madhya Pradesh MLAs 1952–1957
People from Mandsaur district
Madhya Pradesh MLAs 1957–1962
Bharatiya Jana Sangh politicians